The 1975 Scottish League Cup final was played on 25 October 1975 and was the final of the 30th Scottish League Cup competition. It was contested by the Old Firm rivals, Rangers and Celtic. Rangers won the match 1–0, with the only goal scored by Alex MacDonald.

Match details

External links 
 Soccerbase

1975
League Cup Final
Celtic F.C. matches
Rangers F.C. matches
20th century in Glasgow
Old Firm matches